No. 524 Squadron was a Royal Air Force Coastal Command aircraft squadron that operated during the Second World War.

History

No. 524 Squadron was formed at RAF Oban, Argyll and Bute in Scotland on 20 October 1943 to operate the Martin PBM Mariner flying boat. The squadron's role was to introduce the Mariner into RAF service. By the end of 1943 the aircraft was ready for operations but the RAF had decided not to operate the type and the squadron was disbanded on either 7 December 1943 or 29 January 1944.

The squadron was reformed at RAF Davidstow Moor on 7 April 1944 to operate the Vickers Wellington. The squadron carried out night operations of the French coast in preparation for D-Day, mainly attacking E-boats and submarines but also other shipping. It also provided escort to Coastal Command Beaufighters carrying out night strikes. After the Normandy Invasion the squadron moved to the east of England to RAF Docking in a similar role along the Dutch coast. The squadron also directed surface vessels to attack enemy shipping. With the end of the war approaching the squadron was disbanded on either 25 May 1945 or on 25 June 1945 at RAF Langham, the appointment of S/Ldr. Willis pointing to the latter.

Aircraft operated

Squadron bases

Commanding officers

References

Notes

Bibliography

External links

 Squadron history on MOD site
 Squadron bases on www.rafcommands.com
 Squadron histories for nos. 521–540 sqn on RafWeb's Air of Authority – A History of RAF Organisation

Aircraft squadrons of the Royal Air Force in World War II
524 Squadron
Military units and formations established in 1943
Maritime patrol aircraft squadrons